Preeti Kaur (born 26 April 1981) is a Nepalese-Punjabi pop singer. She has won the Shikhar Beat Contest as the best vocalist. She has released several songs with other artists and also as a solo act. Her first song was Jhan Jhan Badhyo. Kaur made her Bollywood career in 2012 with her song Promises from the movie Unforgettable. She participated in Startup Weekend Kathmandu on 12–14 September 2014. The idea pitched by her group, Natural Fertilizer and Waste Management, was chosen and the start-up idea won the first prize.
Kaur recently released her new single "Belly Dancer".

References 

21st-century Nepalese women singers
Living people
1981 births
Musicians from Kathmandu
Nepalese rock singers